The Battle of Autun is said to have been fought in AD 532, when the Merovingian Kings Childebert I and Clothar I decisively defeated the Burgundians, led by King Godomar.

532
530s conflicts
Military history of Germany
Autun
Autun
Autun 532
Autun 532
6th century in Francia